Paulo Sérgio Macedo Dias (born 19 February 1977), known as Murdock, is a Portuguese former professional footballer who played as a midfielder.

References

External links

1977 births
Living people
Footballers from Porto
Portuguese footballers
Association football midfielders
Primeira Liga players
Liga Portugal 2 players
Varzim S.C. players
SC Vianense players
G.D. Ribeirão players
F.C. Tirsense players
Leça F.C. players
Vilanovense F.C. players
G.D. Joane players
F.C. Maia players
CD Candal players